The Fes Riots, also known as the Fes Uprising or Mutiny (from), the Tritl (among the Jewish community) and the Bloody Days of Fes (from ) were riots which started April 17, 1912 in Fes, the then-capital of Morocco, when French officers announced the measures of the Treaty of Fes, which created the French protectorate in Morocco.

The riots broke out shortly after the population of Fes learnt about the treaty, which they generally viewed as a betrayal by Sultan Abd al-Hafid, who had left Fes for Rabat to ensure his safety. After the riots he was forced to abdicate in favour of his brother Yusuf.

Despite warnings of an uprising, most French troops left Fes, leaving behind 1,500 French troops and 5,000 Moroccan askars (local colonial infantrymen) commanded by French officers. On the morning of 17 April, the French officers announced the new measures to their askars. Many units immediately mutinied, causing a total loss of control.

According to the report on the front page of Le Matin on April 19, 1912, the riots broke out in Fes at about 11:00 am Wednesday morning, April 17, 1912. The rebels killed three wireless telegraphy workers and injured a fourth to cut connections with the outside world. The sultan, Abdulhafid, was besieged by rebels at his palace. 

The soldiers attacked their French commanders, then left their barracks and attacked the European and Jewish quarters of the city. According to the Moroccan historian Mohammed Kenbib, "the French commander, General Brulard, thinking that the Jews were supporting the insurgents, ordered his artillery to shell the mallāḥ, causing great devastation, and wounding and killing many people, both Jews and Muslims." The rebels surrendered after two days. The death toll included 66 Europeans, 42 Moroccan Jews and some 600 Moroccan Muslims.

The first account of the riot was written by Hubert Jacques, a journalist at Le Matin, and a personal friend of Hubert Lyautey. The report was strongly critical of Eugène Regnault. The same newspaper listed both Regnault and Lyautey among four candidates likely to be considered for the position of France's resident-general in Morocco.

Bibliography

References

Riots and civil disorder in Morocco
1912 riots
Fez, Morocco
1912 in Morocco
Mutinies
Jews and Judaism in Morocco
Antisemitism in Morocco
Mass murder in 1912
1912 in Judaism
Francophobia
Intifadas
Judaism in Fez
Massacres in Morocco